Efflux may refer to:

 Efflux (microbiology), a mechanism responsible for moving compounds out of cells
 e-flux, a publishing platform and archive

See also 
 Efflux time, part of a measure of paint viscosity
 Flux (biology), movement of a substance between compartments
 Influx (disambiguation)